Innar Mäesalu (born 2 August 1970, in Võru) is an Estonian politician. He was a member of XII Riigikogu.

References

Living people
1970 births
Estonian Reform Party politicians
Members of the Riigikogu, 2011–2015
People from Võru